Partial general elections were held in Belgium on 13 June 1882. The result was a victory for the Liberal Party, which won 79 of the 138 seats in the Chamber of Representatives and 37 of the 69 seats in the Senate. Voter turnout was 75.1%, although only 55,517 people were eligible to vote.

Under the alternating system, elections for the Chamber of Representatives were only held in four out of the nine provinces: Hainaut, Limburg, Liège and East Flanders. Special elections were also held in the arrondissements of Antwerp, Philippeville, Brussels, Nivelles and Namur.

Run-off elections were held a week later, on 20 June 1882.

Results

Chamber of Representatives

Senate

Constituencies
The distribution of seats among the electoral districts was as follows for the Chamber of Representatives, with the difference compared to the previous election due to population growth:

References

1880s elections in Belgium
General
Belgium
Belgium